The Bou Saba family (also known as Bousaba and Busaba) is a Melkite Greek Catholic family from Lebanon. It is one of the oldest families who has lived in Miye ou Miye Village, Sidon, to the south of the Lebanese capital Beirut, with roots dating back to the 1800s.

The family is very well known in the Sidon region, and has a reputation for excellence in international business and academia where several members of the family are prominent academic researchers and business entrepreneurs.

Today, a large portion of the family lives in Beirut and outside Lebanon in the United States, Canada, the UK, France, and Australia.

Family roots
Miye ou Miye is a village in southern Lebanon located 5 km (3.2 mi) East of Sidon and 45 km (28 mi) south of the capital Beirut and it overlooks the Mediterranean Sea. The village lies at an average altitude of 156 m (512 ft) above sea level.

 It stems from the Phoenician language “Mio Mia”, which means a place where there is mummification water. In fact, there are many Phoenician tombs located at the Beirut National Museum that were found by the missionary Dr. George Ford while building Gerard Institute for boys (1881) and other facilities and halls on Miye ou Miye territory.  This is the most likely explanation for the name.
 Due to abundance of water in the area, the village was named Mayya w Mayya, meaning water and water in Aramaic.

Prominent members
 Dr. Nicolas Busaba, MD, Professor;
 Dr. Fadi Busaba, Inventor, IBM;
 Dr. Walid Bou Saba, Professor;
 Dr. Camille Bou Saba, MD, Professor;
 Shady Bou Saba, Entrepreneur & Architect;
 Dr. Charles Bou Saba, Entrepreneur;
 Dr. Fouad Bou Saba, Professor;
 Dr. Adel Bou Saba, Specialist and Lead Orthodontist;
 Dr. Chafic Bou Saba, Professor;
 Dr. Sami Bou Saba, Lead Orthodontist;
 Mr. George Bou Saba, Lead Engineer;
 Dr. Semaan Bou Saba, Professor and former Mayor of Mieh Mieh (1982 - 1998).

Former mayor Semaan Bou Saba was very active and established strong links with other leaders in the area who tried to prevent the sectarian war which later took place in 1985. In 1991, he helped rebuild the infrastructure of the village and encouraged people to return to their homes and re-established a great relationship with neighbouring towns and cities.

References

External links
Bou Saba Family Tree

Lebanese Melkite Greek Catholics
Lebanese business families